Heinrich Bensing (26 July 1911 – 30 December 1955) was a German opera singer.

Life 
Bensing was born in Metz. After the Second World War, he had guest contracts with the Hamburg State Opera (1947-1955), with the Vienna State Opera (1949-1954) and with the Cologne Opera House. After 1945 he sang Don José in Carmen, the title role in The Tales of Hoffmann, the Duke of Mantua in Rigoletto, Radames in Aida, the title role in Don Carlos and Pinkerton in Madama Butterfly.

He died in Frankfurt at age 42.

Repertoire 
Bensing was especially considered a valued singer in the Italian repertoire. He belonged to the "small circle of German tenors who possessed vocal brilliance and power for the great parts of Italian opera."

Recordings 
On the occasion of the re-release of this radio production of Die Frau ohne Schatten from the year 1950 (Symphonie-Orchester des Hessischen Rundfunks, conductor: Winfried Zillig) on CD, Bensing's "experience in the Italian sector", his "largely effortless mastery of the unpleasant tessitura" and his " easily understandable youthful heroic tenor" were particularly praised.

Sources 
 Karl-Josef Kutsch, Leo Riemens: Großes Sängerlexikon. Third, extended edition. Munich 1999. Volume 1: Aarden–Davis, .

References

External links 
 
 Heinrich Bensing on Forgotten opera singers
 Heinrich Bensing Durch die Wälder, durch die Auen Der Freischütz (YouTube)

1911 births
1955 deaths
Musicians from Metz
German operatic tenors
20th-century German male opera singers